Peter Ellis Eyton (1827 - 19 June 1878) was a Liberal Party politician.

He was elected Liberal MP for Flint Boroughs in 1874, but died in 1878 after four years in office.

References

External links
 

Liberal Party (UK) MPs for Welsh constituencies
UK MPs 1874–1880
People from Flint, Flintshire
1827 births
1878 deaths